Bradeley Green is a village in Cheshire East, England. It is located on the A49 road north of Whitchurch and on the county border with Shropshire. 

Villages in Cheshire